Johan Botha (born 2 May 1982) is a South African-Australian cricket coach, cricketer and long-distance runner, who played for the South African national team between 2005 and 2012. He moved to Australia in 2012 to play in that country's domestic leagues, and in 2016 became an Australian citizen. In January 2019, he retired from all forms of the game. However, in December 2020, he made a comeback as a replacement player for the Hobart Hurricanes in the 2020–21 Big Bash League.

Early life and career
Botha was born in Johannesburg but attended Grey High School in Port Elizabeth, the same school that other notable South African cricketers such as Graeme Pollock attended, and captained a South Africa Schools cricket team. In the early parts of his cricket career he was a medium-pace bowler, but when he was playing cricket for the Warriors, future South African coach Mickey Arthur suggested that he should switch bowling style to off break, which Botha then bowled for the rest of his professional career. Once he had made the switch he also focused on learning to bowl a doosra, a ball which turns in the opposite direction to a normal off break.

A year after changing bowling styles, Botha travelled with South Africa A, South Africa's second XI team, to Sri Lanka. He took key wickets and scored runs to put his name up as a potential future Test spinner for South Africa.

Test debut and throwing allegations
Botha made his Test debut against Australia at the Sydney Cricket Ground in January 2006 during the 2005–06 tour, and claimed batsman Mike Hussey as his first Test wicket. However, he was reported for throwing the ball at the conclusion of the match. He was allowed to play several games during the 2005–06 VB Series, but in February, was suspended from bowling following an analysis by bowling expert Bruce Elliott. He hoped to return to bowling after an examination by the ICC in August 2006, but he was found still to be straightening his arm more than the acceptable 15 degrees.

On 21 November 2006, Botha's action was passed by the International Cricket Council and he was again eligible for selection by the South African national team.

On 14 April 2009, Botha was again reported for suspected illegal action. The match officials cited concern over two components of Botha's repertoire, his quicker ball and his doosra, after the completion of fourth ODI against Australia at Port Elizabeth.

Captaincy of the Protea T20I and ODI team 
On 20 August 2010, Graeme Smith announced that he was to surrender the captaincy in T20 Internationals but continue playing in the format. Cricket South Africa subsequently handed over the captaincy to his deputy Botha. Botha also took the One-Day International captaincy after the 2011 Cricket World Cup when Smith gave up his ODI captaincy. The deciding factor was that Botha had led South Africa to a series win against Australia earlier in 2010 when Smith was absent with injury.

Coaching career
Botha was the fielding coach for the Islamabad United and Karachi Kings in the 2017 and 2020 seasons of the Pakistan Super League respectively. He has been the Assistant coach and the Head Coach of Multan Sultans in 2018 and 2019 seasons respectively. In 2020, he was appointed the Head Coach of Islamabad United for the 2021 edition of the PSL. He is also the Head Coach for the Guyana Amazon Warriors in the Caribbean Premier League since 2018.

See also 
 List of international cricketers called for throwing

References

External links

 

1982 births
Living people
Cricketers from Johannesburg
Australian cricketers
South Australia cricketers
ACA African XI One Day International cricketers
Adelaide Strikers cricketers
Border cricketers
Cricketers at the 2011 Cricket World Cup
Eastern Province cricketers
Rajasthan Royals cricketers
South African cricket captains
South African cricketers
South Africa One Day International cricketers
South Africa Test cricketers
South Africa Twenty20 International cricketers
Delhi Capitals cricketers
Trinbago Knight Riders cricketers
South African emigrants to Australia
Sydney Sixers cricketers
Hobart Hurricanes cricketers
Northamptonshire cricketers
Alumni of Grey High School
Ireland cricketers
Australian cricket coaches